Dave Tozer is an American Grammy Award-winning record producer, songwriter, and musician. He has worked with several R&B, hip-hop, rock and pop artists including John Legend, Kanye West, Jay-Z, Justin Timberlake, Bruno Mars, John Mayer, Snoop Dogg, Rick Ross, Kimbra, Natasha Bedingfield, Needtobreathe, Three 6 Mafia, Musiq Soulchild, Emeli Sande, Craig David, Chrisette Michele, Mayer Hawthorne, James Bay, Estelle, DEV and Jazmine Sullivan.

Early life
Hailing from Bridgeton, New Jersey, Tozer taught himself guitar, bass and keyboard. After moving to Philadelphia in the late 1990s, Tozer honed his production skills at various Philadelphia-area studios, such as the legendary Sigma Sound Studios and began working as a freelance musician playing everything from Hip-Hop and Rock to R&B and Pop. Through Max Blumenthal, a mutual friend, Tozer met University of Pennsylvania student John Stephens (later John Legend) and began a fruitful, professional relationship. In addition to developing creatively with Legend, Tozer produced his three independently released albums: John Stephens (2000), Live at Jimmy‘s Uptown (2001) and Live at SOB's (2003).

Musical career

2004–2007 
In 2004, Tozer contributed to eight tracks on Legend‘s Grammy Award-winning major label debut Get Lifted, and his writing skills garnered him a publishing deal with Viacom-owned Famous Music Publishing. 2005 proved to be an important year for Tozer with the success of Get Lifted, which earned eight Grammy nominations and reached multi-platinum status. Legend won three awards including Best New Artist and Best R&B Album. Tozer was a producer on Get Lifted] and the track "Stay With You," which Tozer co-wrote and produced, was also nominated for Best Traditional R&B Vocal Performance.

In 2005, soon after the success of Get Lifted, Tozer was crafting songs for artists such as Heather Headley and Natasha Bedingfield. He also contributed to Kanye West's Grammy-winning single "Diamonds From Sierra Leone," and produced another Legend track for the Luther Vandross tribute album, So Amazing: An All-Star Tribute to Luther Vandross. For Tozer, the year culminated in a deal with Sony Music as an in-house producer and a renewal of his Famous Music Publishing contract.

In 2006, Tozer worked on the track "Do U Wanna Ride" from Jay-Z's comeback album Kingdom Come. Tozer also reunited with his old friend Legend and produced three songs from his acclaimed second album Once Again, including the iTunes single "On Top Of The World."

In 2007, Tozer continued to work with several different artists, including J Records recording artist  Jazmine Sullivan and Mercury Records recording artist George Stanford.  Along with contributing to the development of the Philadelphia-based artist, Tozer worked to get Stanford signed to Epic Records before he subsequently moved to Mercury Records.

2008–2010 
In 2008, Tozer reunited with longtime collaborator, John Legend to co-write and produce "This Time" on Legend’s third album, Evolver.  In 2009, Tozer worked with American Idol 's Elliott Yamin to co-write and produce the record "Someday" on Yamin's second album, Fight for Love.

In 2010, Tozer wrote and produced "Find Me" for Musiq Soulchild and Jazmine Sullivan for Soulchild’s upcoming album. He also went on to collaborate with Justin Timberlake, co-writing and producing three songs for Timberlake's signees, Free Sol, released on their debut album, No Rules, on Timberlake’s imprint Tennman Records.

2011–2015 
In 2011, Tozer and Legend began working together on what would become Legend's fourth studio album, Love in the Future. Tozer co-executive produced the album with Kanye West. Recording sessions for the album took place over the next two-and-a-half years. The album was released on September 3, 2013, to widespread critical acclaim, and was Grammy-nominated for R&B album of year in 2014. In addition to being one of the album's two executive producers, Tozer produced fifteen tracks, mixed twelve, and co-wrote ten songs for the album.

In 2012, Tozer teamed up with Michael Bolton to co-write and produce the Motown-inspired track, "Gotta Keep Dreamin," for Bolton's, Ain't No Mountain High Enough: A Tribute to Hitsville.  Later that year, Tozer worked with Mayer Hawthorne, co-writing and producing "The Valley."

In 2013, Tozer co-wrote and produced "Painted In Tears" for X-factor runner-up and Columbia Records recording artist Rebecca Ferguson. In addition, Tozer mixed Pixie Lott's "Higher & Higher," as well as two songs for the award-winning soundtrack to 12 Years A Slave, "Move" and "Roll, Jordan, Roll." Tozer also collaborated with Warner Bros. Records recording artist Kimbra on her album, The Golden Echo, co-producing and co-writing the track "Nobody But You."

On August 12, 2013, Legend's "All of Me," which Tozer produced and mixed, impacted U.S radio as the third single from Love in the Future. The week ending May 16, 2014, "All of Me" peaked at number one on the Billboard Hot 100, becoming Legend’s first number one single in the United States. "All of Me" went on to reign the Hot 100 for two weeks and become certified eight times platinum status in the United States. The song peaked at number two in the United Kingdom and New Zealand and topped the charts in Australia, Canada, Ireland, Portugal, Sweden, Switzerland and the Netherlands.

In 2014, Tozer produced and mixed the track "Home" on Ella Eyre's Feline album.

2016–present 
In 2016, Tozer co-wrote, produced and mixed "Beautiful & Fragile" (feat. Jay Prince) for UK newcomer D/C. Tozer co-wrote two songs, and produced a significant amount of Needtobreathe's sixth LP Hard Love, which was released on July 15, 2016, and debuted at number 2 on the Billboard 200 chart. Tozer produced and mixed "All We Needed," and "Warm It Up," which he also co-wrote, on the Craig David album Following My Intuition, which was released on September 30, 2016 and debuted at number 1 on the UK Albums Chart.

On March 22, 2017, Legend released "In America."  Produced and co-written by Tozer, this song was featured on the season 2 premiere of WGN’s hit show, Underground.  A politically charged record that addresses issues of economic hardship and social injustice, Rolling Stone said of "In America," "‘In America’ moves deftly between a thumping verse and a sweeping chorus, building incrementally to a gospel-tinged fever pitch that tapers swiftly into a sparse, chilling end. Legend presides over the track with equal parts anger and hope."

Philosophy 
In an interview with David Weiss of SonicScoop, Tozer summed up his approach as a producer, stating, “Magic is what I’m after. Writing a great song, it's like you've tapped into some spirit that’s guiding you.  The words flow, the dots connect, and you've created something with a mystical quality.  You know that feeling when it comes.  When I’m with an artist, I’m on the lookout for voodoo.”

Discography
2016: Craig David - Following My Intuition 
2016: Needtobreathe - Hard Love 
2016: D/C - Badman 
2016: Mayer Hawthorne - Man About Town 
2015: Ella Eyre - Feline
2014: Kimbra - The Golden Echo
2013: Rebecca Ferguson - Freedom 
2013: John Legend - "Roll Jordan Roll", "Move" featuring Fink
2013: John Legend - Love in the Future
2013: Pixie Lott - "Higher & Higher" 
2013: Michael Bolton - Ain't No Mountain High Enough: A Tribute To Hitsville, USA 
2010: Emile Sande - "Nothing Left To Lose" 
2010: Musiq Soulchild - "Find Me" feat. Jazmine Sullivan 
2010: FreeSol - "The Coolest", "Panic Attack", "Restraining Order" 
2009: Elliott Yamin - Fight for Love 
2008: John Legend - Evolver
2008: George Stanford - Big Drop 
2008: Lizz Wright - The Orchard 
2006: Jay-Z - Kingdom Come
2006: John Legend - Once Again 
2005: Kanye West - Late Registration
2005: Various Artists - So Amazing: An All-Star Tribute to Luther Vandross 
2004: John Legend - Get Lifted 
2003: John Legend - Live at SOB's 
2001: John Legend - Live at Jimmy's Uptown
2000: John Legend - John Stephens

Selected credits

References

External links

Producer Dave Tozer Helps John Legend Find Truth in ‘Love’
Forbes Magazine - Dave Tozer: Making Legend-ary Hits
Mix Magazine - Producer Dave Tozer: Philly Musical Roots, With New York Production Style
Dave Tozer on Making Hits for John Legend with UAD-2 & Logic Pro X
SourceTV Exclusive: Interview with John Legend’s ‘Love In The Future’ Executive Producer Dave Tozer
VIBE Interview: Producer Dave Tozer Talks Making Of John Legend's 'Love In The Future,' Working With Kanye West
SonicScoop: Inside John Legend’s “Love in the Future” – Track by Track with Executive Producer Dave Tozer
John Legend Explores Hope, Strife in Charged New Song 'In America'
Producer Dave Tozer Talks Co-Writing John Legend’s Politically Charged Single ‘In America’

Year of birth missing (living people)
Living people
Record producers from New Jersey
Songwriters from New Jersey
Grammy Award winners
Guitarists from New Jersey
American male guitarists
American male songwriters